Garen Boyajian ( born July 5, 1987) is a Canadian actor. While continuing to perform in a number of television series and feature films, in 2008 he established a production company with a collection of films in active development.

Career
Boyajian was born in Toronto to a Lebanese born Armenian father and Italian Canadian mother. He studied at Bayview Glen School and continued with an honours degree in business and marketing from York University.

He started acting at age 13, appearing in television commercials and in Aaron Carter music videos. But it was his appearance as a distraught young Arshile Gorky in Atom Egoyan's award-winning Ararat that got the attention of critics. Soon he landed main roles in television series and such as Radio Free Roscoe, ReGenesis, Monster Warriors, The Border. His role in The Cross Road won him "Best Actor Award" in the Monaco International Film Festival. Other film roles included  and roles in films most notably Three Veils, The Son of an Afghan Farmer and Bamboo Shark. He has also acted in lead and supporting roles in a number of theatrical productions.

Filmography

Film actor
Feature films
2002: Ararat as Young Arshile Gorky
2004: New York Minute as Manjhur
2006: Between Truth and Lies as Steve Wright (TV movie)
2008: The Cross Road as Salaam
2011: Three Veils as Jamal
2011: Bamboo Shark as Raj (post-production)
2012: The Son of an Afghan Farmer as Sherif
2016: The Promise as Eric Boghosian

TV series
2001: Screech Owls as Sam (8 episodes - TV series)
2003-2005: Radio Free Roscoe as Ed (18 episodes - TV series)
2004: Instant Star as Hunter in episode "Even Better Than the Real Thing" (TV series)
2004-2008: ReGenesis as Raymond / Nasib Yosuf (11 episodes - TV series)
2005: Our Fathers as Vito's Brother (TV movie)
2006: Jeff Ltd. as a Persian Child in episode "Ali Baba and the 40 Carpets" (TV series)
2006: Monster Warriors as Brighton / Rody (6 episodes - TV series)
2008: The Border as Sami / Asif Kafeel (6 episodes - TV series)
Shorts
2008: Mookie's Law as Arab
2016 : Game Shakers as Burdy

Theater actor
A Crooked Man - Lead role (Alianak Productions / Hrant Alianak)
The Man Who Came to Dinner - Lead role (Bayview Glen Productions / Norm Reynolds)
Wanda's World - Lead role (Armstrong Productions / Dean Armstrong)

Producer
2008- : The Dove
2010- : "Death is a Lonely Business"

Awards
In 2008, Winner of "Best Actor" at the Monaco International Film Festival for his role as Salaam in The Cross Road
Co-winner of "Best Ensemble Cast" at the same festival for the same film. Award shared with Shenae Grimes, Tommy Lioutas, Bruce Gooch and Sean O'Neill.
In 2011, Winner of "Best Actor in a Supporting Role" at the International Filmmaker Festival for his role as Jamal in "Three Veils".

References

 Campus Life: Toronto's Hottest Students - Model Search 2006

External links
 Official website
 YouTube
 

1987 births
Living people
Male actors from Toronto
Canadian male film actors
Canadian male television actors
Canadian people of Armenian descent
Canadian people of Italian descent